Mariya Volodymyrivna Chorna (Ukrainian: Марія Володимирівна Чорна; born in 26 August 1974), is a Ukrainian politician and statesman who had served as the Governor of Kirovohrad Oblast from 2021 to 2022.

Biography
On 27 May 2021, by decree of the President of Ukraine Volodymyr Zelenskyy, Chorna was appointed as Governor of Kirovohrad Oblast

On 7 March 2022, Chorna was dismissed as Governor by President Zelenskyy, and was replaced by Andriy Raykovych.

Family 
She is married and has a son.

References

1974 births
Living people
National Academy of State Administration alumni
21st-century Ukrainian women politicians
Governors of Kirovohrad Oblast